Xubida punctilineella is a moth in the family Crambidae. It was described by William Barnes and James Halliday McDunnough in 1913. It is found in North America, where it has been recorded from Florida.

References

Haimbachiini
Moths described in 1913